Sojourn: Journal of Social Issues in Southeast Asia is an interdisciplinary journal devoted to the study of social and cultural issues in Southeast Asia. It publishes empirical and theoretical research articles to promote and disseminate scholarship in and on the region. Areas of special concern include ethnicity, religion, tourism, urbanization, migration, popular culture, social and cultural change, and development. Fields most often represented in the journal are anthropology, sociology and history. Three issues of Sojourn are published per year (March, July, November).

Abstracting and Indexing 
Sojourn is abstracted and indexed in the Social Sciences Citation Index and Scopus.

References

External links

 Sojourn at Project MUSE

Southeast Asian studies journals
Publications established in 1986
Biannual journals
English-language journals